Chris Beech is the name of:

Chris Beech (footballer, born 1974), English football player and coach
Chris Beech (footballer, born 1975), English football player